Regina B. Schofield (born Regina Ann Brown on January 14, 1962) is a former United States Assistant Attorney General for the Office of Justice Programs.

Personal
Schofield was born in Natchez and raised in Bude, Mississippi. She received her bachelor's degree in business administration from Mississippi College and an M.B.A. from Jackson State University. In 2005, she was nominated to Who’s Who Among American Women and in 2014, Mississippi College's School of Business awarded her the Alumna of the Year Award. In 2015, she earned a Mediation Certificate to work in General District Courts across the Commonwealth of Virginia. Schofield serves on several national boards, including the Cal Ripken Sr. Foundation (http://ripkenfoundation.org/), Innovate + Educate (http://www.innovate-educate.org/connect), the Maryland Business Roundtable for Education (http://mbrt.org/), and the National Center for the Prevention of Community Violence (http://solveviolence.com/).

Career

Policy & Community Engagement 
In the spring of 1993, Schofield began working for the International Council of Shopping Centers (ICSC). ICSC is the global trade association of the shopping center industry. Its members include shopping center owners, developers, managers, marketing specialists, investors, lenders, retailers and other professionals as well as academics and public officials. While at ICSC, she lobbied on environmental issues, telecommunications deregulation and indoor air standards.

Schofield was recruited by Casey Family Programs in 2007 to leave the U.S. Department of Justice. She left with the belief that public-private partnerships are vital in strengthening local communities. Casey Family Programs has a compelling mission to safely reduce the need for foster care 50 percent by the year 2020, increase the safety and success of children and strengthen the resilience of families. While at Casey she was awarded the President and CEO's Jim Casey Leadership Award in recognition of her efforts to transform and align the foundation's strategic plan with stronger public policy engagement at the state and federal levels of government. As one of the most important corporate leaders and innovators of his time, Jim Casey understood that ensuring the safety and success of every child was critical to the continued prosperity of our nation. Schofield's efforts at Casey led to the October 2008 passage of the most significant child welfare legislation enacted in over a decade by the U.S. Congress.

Schofield left Casey Family Programs in 2010 to work for the world's largest non-profit research and development organization, Battelle, a 501(c)(3) charitable trust. Battelle was founded on industrialist Gordon Battelle’s vision that business and scientific interests can go hand-in-hand as forces for positive change. Battelle’s mission includes a strong charitable commitment to community development and education. In this role, Schofield is responsible for designing and executing a STEM (science, technology, engineering and math) agenda. Battelle's inclusive approach is focused on strengthening minority & underserved populations exposure to STEM roles in an increasingly complex world.

Government 
Schofield began her civil service career as a political appointee in 1991 with President George H.W. Bush as a Confidential Assistant to the Assistant Secretary of Education for Policy and Planning in the United States Department of Education. Before leaving the Department in 1993, she became the Deputy White House Liaison. In 1998, she went to work for the  United States Postal Service as Manager of Government Relations and managed postal service relationships in 7 states west of the Mississippi River.

Schofield left the USPS in 2001 to serve in President George W. Bush's Administration as the White House Liaison to the United States Department of Health and Human Services. She served in that role until her departure in 2005, but in 2002 Secretary Tommy Thompson also appointed her to serve as the Department's director of Intergovernmental Affairs. Her passion in that role involved working with Native American communities to strengthen their access to the Department resources beyond the Indian Health Service. For her commitment to youth in Indian County, Regina was awarded the National Youth Service Award, Native American National Advisory Council for Boys & Girls Clubs of America, 2007

Schofield was confirmed Assistant Attorney General for the Office of Justice Programs on June 8, 2005. She was the National AMBER Alert coordinator and oversaw initiatives including Project Safe Neighborhoods, Project Safe Childhood, the President's DNA Initiative, the Prisoner Reentry Initiative, and Helping America's Youth.
She announced her resignation on September 13, 2007—just one day prior to the release of an internal DOJ audit revealing extravagant travel and banquet expenses—effective September 28, 2007.

An internal Justice Department audit, released one day after her resignation, on September 14, 2007, revealed that the department had sent employees to 10 conferences over the last two years, with unusually high expenses, including $4.04 per serving of Swedish meatballs at a dinner. Six of the 10 conferences were approved by Schofield's department. It is not known whether her departure from the Department is related to this investigation. The department spent more than $13,000 on cookies and brownies for 1,542 attendees of a four-day conference in 2005. A networking session that offered butterfly shrimp, coconut lobster skewers and Swedish meatballs for a Community Oriented Policing Services conference in July 2006 cost more than $60,000. (source: http://www.foxnews.com/story/0,2933,296838,00.html)

Speculation exists regarding a link between Schofield's departure date and the report release date one day later. In the aftermath of her departure, she was described as "someone who 'takes care of herself' and is 'perfectly coiffed.'" She was also tight.(source: http://abovethelaw.com/2007/09/musical-chairs-crickets-chirping-at-the-doj/)

Exposed Problems Within OJJDP

During a compressed grant making season in early 2007, many erroneous assumptions have been made, including the belief that Schofield provided information "that J. Robert Flores, administrator of the U.S. Office of Juvenile Justice and Delinquency Prevention (OJJDP), 'misrepresented the rating scores' of bidders for the National Juvenile Justice Programs last year, hiding the fact that most of his choices received lower scores than many of the proposals that he rejected.".

Flores was eventually investigated by the Inspector General, testified before the Oversight Committee and Government Reform, and then left OJJDP in 2009.

In regards to the matter, Chief of Staff at OJJDP, Michele DeKonty refused to speak with investigators from the House Committee on Oversight and Government Reform by asserting her Fifth Amendment privilege. DeKonty was then fired June 24, 2008.

References

1962 births
Living people
United States Assistant Attorneys General
Jackson State University alumni
People from Franklin County, Mississippi
People from Natchez, Mississippi